Majid Barzegar (born March 6, 1973, in Hamedan) is an Iranian film director, producer, screenwriter, and photographer. He established his own film company Rainy pictures in 2005 with the aim of stimulating the independent film production in Iran.

Biography
Since 1990, the critically acclaimed Iranian filmmaker and producer, Majid Barzegar has been involved in the production of many independent short and feature films. Most of these films have been showcased at various international film festivals including Berlinale, San Sebastian Film Festival, Rotterdam Film Festival, São Paulo Film Festival and Thessaloniki Film Festival, besides many others.

A Minor Leap Down, produced by Barzegar, has been recently won the reputable FIPRESCI's prize in the Panorama section of Berlinale 2015. Parviz, co-produced and directed by Barzegar himself, has won numerous awards including the Jury's Special Mention Award (Competitive Section-New Directors) of the 2012 San Sebastian International Film Festival and the NETPAC Award at the 2012 Asiatica Film Mediale, Rome, Italy. His 2010 film Rainy Seasons also won the Jury's Special Mention Award at the 34th São Paulo International Film Festival in Brazil and was nominated for the Tiger Awards at the 2011 Rotterdam International Film Festival.

Barzegar has also been the president of the board of the Iranian Short Film Association (ISFA) since 2008.

As a producer, Barzegar founded his Tehran-based company rainypictures in 1998 with the aim of developing and producing independent, original films that stand out amid the humdrum of Iranian mainstream cinema.

Filmography

References

External links

1973 births
Living people
Iranian film directors
Iranian screenwriters
Iranian producers
Soore University alumni